Br'er Fox and Br'er Bear (also spelled Brer Fox and Brer Bear) are fictional characters from African-American oral traditions popular in the Southern United States. These characters have been recorded by many different folklorists, but are most well-known from the folktales adapted and compiled by Joel Chandler Harris, featuring his character Uncle Remus.

Disney adaptions
In the animated sequences of the 1946 Walt Disney-produced film Song of the South like in the stales, Br'er Fox is the stories' antagonist, while Br'er Bear is his unintelligent accomplice. Br'er Fox was voiced by actor James Baskett, who also portrayed the live-action character Uncle Remus, while Brer Bear was voiced by Nick Stewart. In contrast to the earlier illustrations of Frederick S. Church, A. B. Frost, and E. W. Kemble, the Disney animators depict the characters in a more slapstick, cartoony style.

The Disney versions of the characters have made appearances in other works:
Br'er Fox and Br'er Bear appear in the Splash Mountain attractions at Disneyland, Tokyo Disneyland and formerly at Magic Kingdom. They also appeared with Br'er Rabbit at the Walt Disney Parks and Resorts for meet-and-greets, parades and shows.
A segment dedicated to the pair is featured in the 1956 one-hour television special Our Unsung Villains.
Br'er Fox and Br'er Bear make cameo appearances in several episodes of the Disney's House of Mouse television series, with Bonkers in the episode "Casabonkers", and in the direct-to-video release Mickey's Magical Christmas: Snowed in at the House of Mouse. 
Br'er Bear has made cameo appearances in other Disney films. He can be seen frequently in various scenes in Who Framed Roger Rabbit, and he is also seen in The Lion King 1½ along with many other Disney toons coming into the theater in the ending scene.
Br'er Bear has also made sporadic appearances in Disney comics. Although one Disney comic names Br'er Bear a title of "Honorary Constable of Cockleberry County" his "performance" is more akin to Fearless Fosdick. They appear sometimes in the Li'l Bad Wolf stories, where Br'er Bear is a farmer, and is sometimes on friendly terms with the other animals. Br'er Bear and Br'er Fox, along with Br'er Weasel, Br'er Buzzard and the Big Bad Wolf (A.K.A. Zeke Wolf or Br'er Wolf) are members of the "Foul Order of Foulfellows". A running gag is Zeke trying to get his hands on Br'er Bear's chickens so he can eat them, and he ends up getting pounded by Br'er Bear. They also appear often in the Dutch Donald Duck comics, usually hunting Broer Konijn (Dutch for Brer Rabbit). There, they are also given the names Rein Vos and Bruin Beer, respectively.
Both Br'er Bear and Br'er Fox make an appearance in the 2011 video game Kinect: Disneyland Adventures (Disneyland Adventures in the 2017 remaster) and both can be seen near Splash Mountain in Critter Country.
Br'er Bear's coat and farm hat are featured in 2022 film Chip 'n Dale: Rescue Rangers.

Other adaptations 

The cult film Coonskin, directed by Ralph Bakshi, focuses on a trio of characters inspired by the original folktales. Br'er Rabbit, Br'er Bear and Br'er Fox (renamed "Preacher Fox" in the film) all appear, and the elements of the stories are moved to a then-contemporary urban setting.

The Adventures of Brer Rabbit was a 2006 animated feature including the characters, aimed at families.

See also 
 Sister Fox = Lisichka-sestrichka ( which means Fox-sister)

References

American folklore
Anthropomorphic foxes
Fictional bears
Song of the South characters
Disney comics characters
Folklore of the Southern United States
Literary characters introduced in 1881
Characters in American novels of the 19th century
Georgia folklore
Male literary villains
Literary duos
Animated duos
African-American cultural history
Male characters in animation
Folklore characters